Castlemore Moat is a motte-and-bailey and National Monument in County Carlow, Ireland.

Location
It is not to be confused with Castlemore House, a 19th-century country house 1 kilometre south of the motte.

History and archaeology

The motte and bailey castle was constructed in the 12th century AD by Raymond FitzGerald (Raymond le Gros), one of the commanders of the Norman invasion of Ireland. The land of Forth O'Nolan was granted to Raymond and he married Basilia, sister of Strongbow. They lived together at Castlemore.

References

Archaeological sites in County Carlow
National Monuments in County Carlow
Castles in County Carlow